Adam Sebastian Jarubas (born 27 December 1974 in Busko-Zdrój) is a Polish politician and former Marshal of Świętokrzyskie Voivodeship (2006-2018). He became vice-president of Polish People's Party in December 2012. He was the official candidate of the party for the office of President of Poland in the 2015 Polish presidential elections. In the first round he received 1,60% of votes, which gave him the sixth place among the candidates.

External links 
 Europeparliament: Adam Sebastian Jarubas

References

Candidates in the 2015 Polish presidential election
Polish People's Party MEPs
1974 births
Living people
MEPs for Poland 2019–2024
People from Busko County
Voivodeship marshals of Poland
Świętokrzyskie Voivodeship
Recipients of the Gold Cross of Merit (Poland)
Knight's Crosses of the Order of Merit of the Republic of Hungary (civil)